Prince Boun Oum (also Prince Boun Oum Na Champassak; ; ; ; 2 December 1912 – 17 March 1980) was the son of King Ratsadanay, and was the hereditary prince of Champassak and also Prime Minister of the Kingdom of Laos from March 1949 to February 1950 and again from December 1960 to June 1962.

Early life
He was born in Don Talad in 1912, the eldest son of Prince Ratsadanay, Prince of Champassak by his fourth wife, Princess Sudhi Saramuni. He was educated at Wat Liep Monastery Sch. and l'École de Droit, Vientiane. He met Mom Bouaphanh Soumpholphakdy of Kengkok and married in 1943. The couple had six sons and three daughters: Prince Keo Champhonesak na Champassak, Prince Saysanasak na Champassak, Prince Keo Halusak na Champassak, Prince Simoungkhounsak na Champassak, Prince Vannahsak na Champassak, Prince Vongdasak na Champassak, Princess Ninhdasak na Champassak, Princess Keosondarasak na Champassak and Princess Keomanisak na Champassak. He had 11 grandchildren. He succeeded on the death of his father as Head of the Princely House of Champassak, June 1946. At the same time, he renounced his rights in order to establish a unified kingdom, the Kingdom of Laos, on 27 August 1946. He was appointed the President of the Royal Council in 1947. In 1949, he was appointed as Inspector-General of the Kingdom.

Prime Minister of Laos
Sympathetic to the French in Laos, he commanded a force of 15,000 that fought Japanese troops and the Lao Issara in the south of Laos. Titular leader of the royalist faction (and one of the Three Princes of the Kingdom of Laos), he served as Prime Minister of the Kingdom of Laos from March 1949 to February 1950 and again from December 1960 to June 1962 when The National Assembly installed him by unanimous vote.

He retired from politics to pursue business interests from his base in Pakse and Champassak but continued to be a major power broker until his exile in 1975, the year the communist Pathet Lao came to power. In 1975 he went to France for medical treatment and never returned to Laos. He died in Boulogne-Billancourt, France in 1980 and his ashes are buried at the Cimetiere de Trivaux in Meudon France, next to his wife Princess Bouaphanh na Champassak (1920–2013).

Honours

National honours
 Knight Grand Cross of the Order of the Million Elephants and the White Parasol. 
 Knight Grand Cross of the Order of the Crown of Laos.
 Commander of the Order of Civic Merit of Laos.

Foreign honours
 Knight Grand Cordon of the Order of the White Elephant, Thailand [special class].
 Grand Officer of the Royal Order of Cambodia.
 Commander of the Legion of Honour.
 Combatant's Cross (1940).
 Croix de Guerre [with palm and star] (1941).
 Medal of French Gratitude [1st class] (1946).
 Croix de Guerre 1939–1945 (1946).
 Indochina Campaign commemorative medal (1954).
 Resistance Medal [2nd class] (1945).

Ancestry

References

1912 births
1980 deaths
Boun Oum
Laotian anti-communists
People of the Vietnam War
Prime Ministers of Laos
Pretenders
Laotian exiles
Commandeurs of the Légion d'honneur
Recipients of the Croix de Guerre 1939–1945 (France)
People from Champasak province